Amilcare Cipriani (October 18, 1844 in Anzio – April 30, 1918 in Paris) was an  Italian socialist, anarchist and patriot.

Cipriani was born in Anzio in a family originally from Rimini. In June 1859, at the age of 15, he fought with Giuseppe Garibaldi alongside  Piedmontese troops in the Battle of Solferino in the Second Italian War of Independence. In 1860, he deserted to join Garibaldi's Expedition of the Thousand in Sicily in order to conquer the Kingdom of the Two Sicilies, (then ruled by the Bourbons).

Reinserted in the ranks of the regular army after an amnesty, he defected back to re-join Garibaldi in the 1862 expedition to Rome with the intent of liberating the city and annexing it to the Kingdom of Italy. However, the Royal Italian Army defeated Garibaldi's army of volunteers in the Battle of Aspromonte (August 29, 1862). Garibaldi was wounded and taken prisoner; Cipriani escaped capture, but was forced to flee abroad, finding refuge in Greece.

Cipriani participated in a demonstration leading to the expulsion of Otto of Greece in 1862. After joining the First International in 1867, Cipriani participated in the defence of the Paris Commune in 1871, for which he was condemned to death but subsequently exiled to the French penal colony of New Caledonia along with 7,000 others.

After the  pardons that followed in 1879, Cipriani returned to France in 1880, but was quickly expelled.
Arrested in Italy in January 1881 for "conspiracies", he served seven years of a twenty-year sentence before a popular campaign secured his release in 1888. At the Zurich congress of the Second International in 1893, Cipriani resigned his mandate in solidarity with Rosa Luxemburg and the anarchists who were excluded from the proceedings.

In 1897, he volunteered in the Garibaldi legion and went with Garibaldi's son, Ricciotti Garibaldi, and former leaders of the Fasci Siciliani, Nicola Barbato and Giuseppe De Felice Giuffrida, to Greece to fight against the Turks in the  Turkish-Greek war and sustained wounds before being re-imprisoned in Italy for a further three years on July 30, 1898.

He was elected as a deputy to the Italian Chamber of Deputies (and subsequently re-elected eight times) but never claimed his seat because he refused to swear an oath of allegiance to the King. In 1891, he was among the delegates to the  conference in Switzerland which established the short-lived Socialist Revolutionary Anarchist Party. He supported Peter Kropotkin's view of WW1.

He wrote for Le Plébéien and other anarchist periodicals. Cipriani died in a Paris hospital on April 30, 1918, at the age of 73. His writings were banned as subversive literature in Italy in 1911. The parents of the future fascist Italian dictator Benito Mussolini (born 1883) gave their son the middle name "Amilcare" in honour of Cipriani.

References

See also

Anarchism and nationalism

1844 births
1918 deaths
Italian anarchists
Italian philhellenes
Italian expatriates in Greece
Greek military personnel of the Greco-Turkish War (1897)
Italian exiles